Three Royal Navy ships have been names HMS Snapdragon, after the flower:

  was an  sloop launched in 1915, during World War I, and sold in 1934.
  was a  launched in 1940, during World War II, and sunk in 1942 in the Mediterranean.
  was another Flower-class corvette, originally named HMS Arabis and launched in 1940. She was transferred to the United States Navy and commissioned as USS Saucy before being returned to the Royal Navy in 1945 and recommissioned as HMS Snapdragon.

References

 

Royal Navy ship names